Andrés Ricardo Pelussi (born October 14, 1977) is a former Argentine-Italian professional basketball player. He was also a member of the senior Argentine national basketball team. At a height of 1.98 m (6'6") tall, and a weight of 114 kg (252 lbs.), he played at the small forward and power forward positions.

Professional career
Pelussi played with Libertad de Sunchales of the Argentine Liga Nacional de Básquetbol (LNB), where he helped the team win the 2008 Argentine League championship. Pelussi spent his entire professional club career in Argentina, aside from three seasons in Italy. He played in the Italian League with Virtus Bologna.

National team career
Pelussi was a long-time member of the senior Argentine national basketball team.  He first participated with the national team at the 2004 South American Championship.  He saw his most extensive action with the Argentine national team at the 2008 South American Championship, where he averaged 12.7 points and 5.5 rebounds per game for the team. He also competed with the bronze medal-winning Argentine team, at the 2009 FIBA Americas Championship, where he played primarily off the bench, averaging 3.3 points and 2.2 rebounds per game.

References

External links
EuroCup Profile
LatinBasket.com Profile
Italian League Profile 

1977 births
Living people
Argentine men's basketball players
Atenas basketball players
Centers (basketball)
Italian men's basketball players
Libertad de Sunchales basketball players
Power forwards (basketball)
Small forwards
Virtus Bologna players
Goodwill Games medalists in basketball
Competitors at the 2001 Goodwill Games